Breachacha Castle (also spelled Breacachadh) is either of two structures on the shore of Loch Breachacha, on the Inner Hebridean island of Coll, Scotland. The earlier (also called Old Breachacha Castle) is a 15th-century tower house that was a stronghold of the Macleans of Coll, the island having been granted to John Maclean in 1431. This castle was superseded by a new dwelling in 1750 (see below) but continued to be occupied for a time, falling into a ruinous state only in the mid-19th century. Although work was performed in the 1930s to prevent further dilapidation, the castle was restored to livable condition only in the 1960s, by Nicholas MacLean-Bristol and his wife Lavinia. It is a Category A listed building.

The Project Trust had the old castle as their original base until a custom built location on the west of the island was created in 1988.

Samuel Johnson and James Boswell stayed at the newer castle on their tour of the Hebrides.

 the newer castle is for sale as a listed property in need of great repair.

Images

References

Coll
Castles in Argyll and Bute
Category A listed buildings in Argyll and Bute